Varasteh is a surname of Persian origin. Notable people with the surname include:

Manshour Varasteh, Iranian political scientist
Mohammad Ali Varasteh (1896–1989), Iranian politician

Surnames of Iranian origin